Lwowiany  or Osada Lwowska  ("Lwów settlement") is a village located in Poland, in the Opole Voivodeship, Głubczyce County and Gmina Głubczyce.

References

Villages in Głubczyce County